Harry Alexander Little  (November 9, 1850 – February 17, 1927),  was an American Major League Baseball player  who played mainly outfield in 1877 for the St. Louis Brown Stockings and Louisville Grays.

References

External links

Baseball players from Missouri
Major League Baseball outfielders
19th-century baseball players
Louisville Grays players
St. Louis Brown Stockings players
1850 births
1927 deaths